Peter Spence is a Canadian film and television actor. He is most noted for his roles as the title character in the 1986 television film The Truth About Alex, one of the first television films ever to address the subject of gay youth, and as Jessie in the 1984 film Unfinished Business, for which he received a Genie Award nomination for Best Supporting Actor at the 6th Genie Awards in 1985.

Career 
Spence's first role was in the CBC Television drama series Home Fires, as Sidney Lowe; during this time, he also appeared in episodes of Hangin' In and The Littlest Hobo. After Home Fires wrapped production in 1983, Spence enrolled at York University, but quickly dropped out after being cast in the films Unfinished Business and The Bay Boy. After completing those films, he moved to New York City to complete his acting education at Circle in the Square Theatre School, sharing an apartment at that time with his Bay Boy castmates Kiefer Sutherland and Leah Pinsent; in 1985, Spence appeared in the film Crazy Moon, playing Sutherland's brother for the second time.

Following The Truth About Alex, Spence moved back to Toronto. He has continued to act, primarily in television films and series guest roles. He appeared most recently in the 2016 film The History of Love. Spence was also a story consultant for the 2019 film Tito.

Filmography

Film

Television

References

External links

Canadian male film actors
Canadian male television actors
Canadian male voice actors
Living people
Male actors from Toronto
Year of birth missing (living people)